Christine Matison (born 29 October 1951) is an Australian former professional tennis player who reached the semi-finals of the 1978 Australian Open as a qualifier.

Matison was the first woman qualifier to reach the semi-finals of a Grand Slam tournament. The next woman qualifier to do so was Alexandra Stevenson in the 1999 Wimbledon Championships.

In 1975, Matison won the doubles of the Western Australian Championships in Perth partnering Lesley Turner Bowrey, beating Sue Barker and Michelle Tyler-Wilson in the final in two sets.

References

External links
 
 

1951 births
Living people
Australian female tennis players
Place of birth missing (living people)